List of members of the National Defence Commission may refer to:

 Members of the 5th National Defence Commission, elected by the 1st Session of the 5th Supreme People's Assembly in 1972.
 Members of the 6th National Defence Commission, elected by the 1st Session of the 6th Supreme People's Assembly in 1977.
 Members of the 7th National Defence Commission, elected by the 1st Session of the 7th Supreme People's Assembly in 1982.
 Members of the 8th National Defence Commission, elected by the 1st Session of the 8th Supreme People's Assembly in 1986.
 Members of the 9th National Defence Commission, elected by the 1st Session of the 9th Supreme People's Assembly in 1990.
 Members of the 10th National Defence Commission, elected by the 1st Session of the 10th Supreme People's Assembly in 1998.
 Members of the 11th National Defence Commission, elected by the 1st Session of the 11th Supreme People's Assembly in 2003.
 Members of the 12th National Defence Commission, elected by the 1st Session of the 12th Supreme People's Assembly in 2009.
 Members of the 13th National Defence Commission, elected by the 1st Session of the 13th Supreme People's Assembly in 2014.